The Mystic Mini-Ton, also called the Mystic Mini-Ton 21, is an American trailerable sailboat that was designed by Canadian Bruce Kirby as an International Offshore Rule Mini Ton class, Midget Ocean Racing Club (MORC) and club one design racer and first built in 1977.

Production
The design was built by Boat Company of Mystic in Mystic, Connecticut, United States, starting in 1977. Only 12 boats were completed and it is now out of production.

Design
The Mystic Mini-Ton is a racing keelboat, built predominantly of fiberglass. It has a fractional sloop rig, a raked stem, a reverse transom, an internally mounted spade-type rudder controlled by a tiller and a fixed fin keel. It displaces  and carries  of ballast.

The boat is normally fitted with a small  outboard motor for docking and maneuvering.

The design has sleeping accommodation for four people.

Operational history
The boat is supported by an active class club that organizes racing events, the Mini Ton Class.

In a 2010 review Steve Henkel described the design as, "sleek-looking" and  noted that boat "had some racing successes in Long Island Sound in her first year, but for some reason not many units were sold, perhaps because the marketers appeared not to push the boat's possibilities as a pocket cruiser. In fact, neither her ads nor her brochure shows her layout below ... But personally, we think she's very good-looking, and knowing that other Kirby designs are almost always good sailors' boats, we have a warm feeling about this one. Too bad they never really caught on."

See also
List of sailing boat types

References

Keelboats
1970s sailboat type designs
Sailing yachts
Trailer sailers
Sailboat type designs by Bruce Kirby
Sailboat types built by Boat Company of Mystic